is a railway station on the Keio Inokashira Line in Setagaya, Tokyo, Japan, operated by the private railway operator Keio Corporation.

Lines

Service pattern
Only all-stations "Local" services stop at this station.

Station layout
The station has two ground-level opposing side platforms on either side of the two tracks, which are side by side. The station building is built above the tracks. The platforms, however, are built in a cutting, over which runs prefectural road 318; for this reason part of the platform is located under this road. The ticket gates are located alongside the road.

Between the ticket gates and platform there is a wheelchair escalator as well as an elevator. The toilets are located on platform 1, and include a multi-purpose toilet.

Platforms

History
It was renamed Shindaita on July 21, 1966.

From February 22, 2013, station numbering was introduced on Keio lines, with Shindaita Station becoming "IN06".

Passenger statistics
In fiscal 2011, the station was used by an average of 8,288 passengers daily.

The passenger figures for previous years are as shown below.

Surrounding area
Shindaita Station is only some 500 m from Shimo-Kitazawa and Higashi-Matsubara stations on either side. From the middle of the Shibuya-bound platform, one can actually see both of the neighboring stations. Perhaps because Shimo-Kitazawa is only a few minutes away on foot and because just outside the station is Kannana Dori Avenue, there is no shopping street by the station.

References

External links

 Shindaita Station information (Keio) 

Railway stations in Japan opened in 1933
Stations of Keio Corporation
Keio Inokashira Line
Railway stations in Tokyo